Albert Gazal is a retired Israeli footballer who was a player in Maccabi Netanya.
He is also the father of Ravid Gazal (who also played for Maccabi Netanya).

Honours

National
 Israeli Premier League (4):
 1970–71, 1973–74, 1977-78, 1979–80
 State Cup (1):
 1978

International
 UEFA Intertoto Cup (2):
 1978, 1980

References

1950 births
Living people
Israeli Jews
Israeli footballers
Maccabi Netanya F.C. players
Maccabi Netanya F.C. managers
Liga Leumit players
Footballers from Netanya
Association football midfielders
Israeli football managers
Egyptian emigrants to Israel